1977 ATP Buenos Aires may refer to:

 1977 ATP Buenos Aires (April)
 1977 ATP Buenos Aires (November)